Wanda Díaz-Merced is an astronomer best known for using sonification to turn large data sets into audible sound.  She currently works at the European Gravitational Observatory Cascina, Italy. As someone who has lost their eyesight, she is a leader in increasing equality of access to astronomy and using audible sound to study astrophysical data. Wanda has been included in the list of the 7 most trailblazing women in science by the BBC.

Early life 

Díaz-Merced was born in Gurabo, a small town in Puerto Rico. Both Diaz-Merced and her sister had physical disabilities, and had to learn to overcome the challenges that brings. As children, the two of them would pretend to fly a space craft and explore other galaxies.

In middle school she entered the school science fair where she won second place. This was a turning point for her as this made her realize that pursuing a career in science was something that might be attainable.

Díaz-Merced lost her sight in her early twenties due to complications with degenerative diabetic retinopathy and found new ways to study stellar radiation without relying on her vision. She realized that she could use her ears to detect patterns in stellar radio data that could potentially be obscured in visual and graphical representation.

Education 

Díaz-Merced attended Matías González García Middle School and Dra. Conchita Cuevas High School in Gurabo, Puerto Rico. She then went on to study physics at the University of Puerto Rico. She received an internship with the Robert Candey at NASA Goddard Spaceflight Center in Maryland, USA after she finished her undergraduate degree. She went on to receive a doctorate in computer science from the University of Glasgow in 2013, where she studied space data analysis. She was then accepted as a post-doctoral fellow at the Center for Astrophysics  Harvard & Smithsonian. and South African Astronomical Observatory in Cape Town

Scientific career 

In 2020, Díaz-Merced accepted a simultaneous collaboration with the Harvard Smithsonian Center for Astrophysics and the European Gravitational Observatory proposal REINFORCE. Before this, she worked at the National Astronomical Observatory Japan (NAOJ), and the South African observatory's Office of Astronomy for Development (OAD). She has led the OAD project AstroSense since April 2014. She worked on the technique after she lost her sight as an undergraduate at the University of Puerto Rico. In 2016, she gave a TED Talk in Vancouver, BC, Canada. She is a member of the International Astronomical Union. While working at the Center for Astrophysics  Harvard & Smithsonian, she collaborated with Gerhard Sonnert on a music album based on her audio representations. Composed by Volkmar Studtrucker, "X-Ray Hydra" includes nine pieces of music derived from NASA's Chandra X-Ray Observatory rendered as sound.

Honors 

In 2011, Diaz-Merced won one of Google's first annual European Scholarship for Students with Disabilities. This scholarship recognizes outstanding Ph.D. students doing exceptional research in the field of computer science.

In 2017 she was awarded an Estrella Luike trophy.

Published works 
 
 
 
 
 
 Díaz-Merced, Wanda. "Making Astronomy Accessible for the Visually Impaired". Scientific American Blog Network. Retrieved 2020-07-12.

References

External links 
 Wanda Díaz-Merced (español)

Year of birth missing (living people)
Living people
Alumni of the University of Glasgow
American women astronomers
American blind people
Blind academics
People from Gurabo, Puerto Rico
Puerto Rican scientists
University of Puerto Rico alumni
Scientists with disabilities